In Greek mythology, Dotis (Ancient Greek: Δωτίδος) was the son of Asterius and Amphictyone (herself daughter of Phthius). According to Pherecydes (c. 450 BC), he was the eponym of the city Dotion (Dotium) in Thessaly. Alternate mythical eponyms were Dotia, daughter of Elatus, and Dotus, son of either Pelasgus or Neonus the son of Hellen.

Note

References 

 Stephanus of Byzantium, Stephani Byzantii Ethnicorum quae supersunt, edited by August Meineike (1790-1870), published 1849. A few entries from this important ancient handbook of place names have been translated by Brady Kiesling. Online version at the Topos Text Project.

Characters in Greek mythology